The 82nd season of the Campeonato Gaúcho kicked off on January 13, 2002 and ended on May 29, 2002. Seventeen teams participated. Holders Grêmio were eliminated in the Semifinals, while Internacional beat 15 de Novembro in the finals and won their 34th title. São Paulo was relegated.

Participating teams

System 
The championship would have three stages:

 First phase: The thirteen teams that didn't participate in the Copa Sul-Minas played against each other in a double round-robin system. After 26 rounds, the champion of each of the halves of the stage and the two teams with the best overall record qualified to the Semifinals and the bottom team was relegated. The teams that qualified to the Semifinals would also play a playoff tournament, the winner of which would qualify to the Copa do Brasil.
 Semifinals: The four remaining teams joined the teams that participated in the Copa Sul-Minas (Internacional, Grêmio, Pelotas and Juventude), and the eight teams were divided in two groups of four teams, the teams in each group playing against each other once, and the group winners qualifying to the Finals.
 Finals: Semifinals winners played in two matches to define the Champions.

Championship

First phase

First round

Second round

Final standings

Semifinals

Finals

Group I

Group II

Finals

References 

Campeonato Gaúcho seasons
Gaúcho